Shilingi is the Swahili word for "shilling". Specifically it may refer to:

East African shilling, the former currency of the British colonies and protectorates in East Africa
Kenyan shilling, the currency of Kenya
Tanzanian shilling, the currency of Tanzania
Ugandan shilling, the currency of Uganda